The men's tournament in volleyball at the 2000 Summer Olympics was the 10th edition of the event at the Summer Olympics, organized by the world's governing body, the FIVB in conjunction with the IOC. It was held in Sydney, Australia from 17 September to 1 October 2000.

Qualification

Pools composition
Teams were seeded following the serpentine system according to their FIVB World Ranking as of January 2000. FIVB reserved the right to seed the hosts as head of pool A regardless of the World Ranking. Rankings are shown in brackets except the hosts.

Rosters

Venues

Preliminary round
The top four teams in each pool qualified for the quarterfinals.

Pool A

|}

|}

Pool B

|}

|}

Final round

Quarterfinals

|}

5th–8th semifinals

|}

Semifinals

|}

7th place match

|}

5th place match

|}

Bronze medal match

|}

Gold medal match

|}

Final standing

Medalists

Awards

Most Valuable Player
 Bas van de Goor
Best Scorer
 Marcos Milinkovic
Best Spiker
 Daniel Howard
Best Blocker
 Andrija Gerić

Best Server
 Osvaldo Hernández
Best Digger
 Vasa Mijić
Best Setter
 Peter Blangé
Best Receiver
 Pablo Meana

References

External links
Final Standing (1964–2000)
Results at Todor66.com
Results at Sports123.com

Men's tournament
Men's events at the 2000 Summer Olympics